is a traditional Japanese snack food. Sweet and deep-fried, it is made primarily of flour, yeast, and brown sugar. It has a deep brown and pitted appearance, and takes the form of a bite-sized pillow or short cylinder. Although traditional karintō is coated with brown sugar, recently other variations appear in the market, such as white sugar, sesame seeds, miso, or peanuts.

In popular culture
 
 In Apollo Justice: Ace Attorney and Phoenix Wright: Ace Attorney: Spirit of Justice, police detective and forensic scientist Ema Skye constantly eats karintō on duty (the snack was localized as chocolate-flavored "snackoos").
 
 In Danganronpa 2: Goodbye Despair, karintō is stated to be one of Fuyuhiko Kuzuryuu's favourite foods.
 
 In Gosick, Kujo gives karintō to Victorique, who comments that they look like dog feces.

 In Lycoris Recoil, karintō are a staple food at the dorm.

History
Karintō's roots are unclear, with primary origination theories being either from around the Nara Period or being derived from a Portuguese snack in a later period.  In either case it has been available from street merchants since at least the Tenpō era, roughly from 1830 to 1841. 

Wagashi
Deep fried foods
Palauan desserts